The Bull River is a  long tributary of the Kootenay River in the Canadian province of British Columbia. It is part of the Columbia River basin, as the Kootenay River is a tributary of the Columbia River.

Course
The Bull River originates in the Rocky Mountains near the Continental Divide. It flows generally south and west, joining the Kootenay River east of Cranbrook.

Aberfeldie Dam
Aberfeldie Dam is a run of the river powerhouse that was built on the Bull River in 1922. A new dam 27M tall was built in 1953. It is operated by BC Hydro. A $95-million redevelopment was completed in 2009 increasing capacity from 5MW to 24MW.

See also
List of British Columbia rivers
Tributaries of the Columbia River

References

Rivers of British Columbia
Tributaries of the Kootenay River
East Kootenay
Kootenay Land District